Miracles of the Jungle is a 1921 American adventure film serial, directed by James Conway and E. A. Martin, in 15 chapters, starring Ben Hagerty, Wilbur Higby, and Al Ferguson. A co-production by Selig Studios and Warner Bros., it was distributed by the Federated Film Exchanges of America; it originally ran in U.S. theaters between May 24 and August 24, 1921.

This film serial is considered lost.

Cast

Production
Through the success of the serial The Lost City, previously made by Selig and Warner, the co-production of Selig Polyscope Company and Warner Bros., Miracles of the Jungle, began. Emma Bell Clifton wrote the original screenplay, which was adapted by E. A. Martin. There were problems during production. William Selig, responsible for the day-to-day filming, accused Warner of inserting spies on the set, and of colluding with distributors to sell the film rights. The production thus dragged on for six months, during which time director E. A. Martin paid attention to the lead actress, with whom he had an affair. Martin's wife confronted him in the studio, and the actress had to stop filming abruptly, necessitating a lot of film ending.

The show was also marred by an incident in which during a scene with a lion, actor Ben Hagerty was injured, which resulted in him being hospitalized for over a month, until he recovered and returned to filming.

Release
The film was given an international release, being released in Brazil under the title Os Milagres da Selva and Milagres do Sertão.

Chapter titles

 The City of Lions
 The Passage of Death
 The Jungle Attack
 The Leopard's Revenge
 The Storm in the Desert
 To the Rescue
 The Leopard's Lair
 Doomed to Death
 In the Hands of the Apes
 Midst Raging Tigers
 Twelve Against One
 Cheating Death
 The Heart of an Elephant
 The Lion's Leap
 All's Well That Ends Well

References

External links

1921 films
1921 lost films
1921 adventure films
American silent serial films
American black-and-white films
Lost American films
1920s American films
Silent adventure films